Interstate 485 (I-485) is a  auxiliary Interstate Highway encircling Charlotte, North Carolina. As a complete loop, it is primarily signed with "inner" and "outer" designations, though at some major interchanges, supplemental signage reflects the local compass orientation of the road. The entire route lies within Mecklenburg County. 

A beltway for the Charlotte metropolitan area was first proposed in the mid-1970s, with the first section opening in 1990. The beltway was completed in stages over the next several decades, with completion of the last segment of the highway on June 5, 2015.

Route description
I-485 travels  around the city of Charlotte, with milemarkers beginning/ending at the I-77/US Highway 21 (US 21) interchange with the highway near Pineville. The beltway is further broken down into four segments: Seddon "Rusty" Goode Freeway (southwest); Craig Lawing Freeway (northwest); H. Allen Tate, Jr. Highway (northeast); and Governor James G. Martin Freeway (southeast).

The southwest segment is six lanes throughout, on concrete, and borders the Steele Creek area. Attractions in this area include the Charlotte Premium Outlets (exit 4) and Lake Wylie. There are also two exits here for the Charlotte Douglas International Airport: exit 6 for the Air Cargo Center and exit 9 for the main terminal. The northwest segment of the beltway is six lanes throughout, on concrete. Attractions in this area include the US National Whitewater Center (exit 12), Northlake Mall (exit 21), and Mountain Island Lake. The northeast segment is eight lanes throughout, using both concrete and asphalt, and borders Huntersville at its northernmost point. Attractions in this area include the Carolina Renaissance Festival (October–November) and Concord Mills. The southeast segment is the largest segment, which goes through the towns of Mint Hill, Matthews, and Pineville, as well as the notable Charlotte neighborhoods University City and Ballantyne area. Over  of the segment is four lane, with six-to-eight-lane sections within the University City, Ballantyne, and Pineville areas, all on asphalt. Attractions in this area include Charlotte Motor Speedway (exit 32), PNC Music Pavilion, the University of North Carolina at Charlotte (UNC Charlotte; exit 33), the Sportsplex at Matthews, Carolina Place Mall (exit 64B), and the President James K. Polk Historic Site (exit 65B).

Although the loop runs within  of the South Carolina state line, and, within  of the Cabarrus County line at the Rocky River Road exit, the entire beltway is within Mecklenburg County's boundaries and never crosses into South Carolina or any neighboring counties. I-485 is Charlotte's only "true" loop road as both I-277 and Route 4 are partial ring roads.

Orientation and signage

Since I-485 is a beltway, the compass orientation of the freeway is not uniform around the loop. To remedy the uniformity issue, the inner–outer orientation system was implemented and became the primary method of signing the direction of travel around the loop. Some sections of the loop are signed with additional north/south or east/west labels (depending on the general direction of travel along a particular stretch) to aid drivers familiar with compass directions. Usually when both systems are utilized on signs, the compass directional banner is placed above the number shield and the inner/outer banner is placed below. Officials originally decided to use only "north" and "south" compass directions when signing the route, but, because this would be confusing with multiple "norths" and "souths", "inner" and "outer" designations were included. Although "east" and "west" signs exist, these will be phased out in favor of "inner" and "outer" designations.

Traffic traveling in a clockwise direction around the city of Charlotte is on the "Inner" loop and traffic traveling in a counterclockwise direction is on the "Outer" loop. This system can be confusing, but it is logical; since traffic in the US generally travels on the right side of the road, the clockwise traveling lanes will always be the "Inner" lanes of a loop.

There are three control cities along the route: Huntersville, Matthews, and Pineville. Secondary control cities, which include Spartanburg, Statesville, Greensboro, and Columbia, are also listed at various interchanges for travelers that want to bypass Charlotte to other destinations, via I-77 and I-85.

Dedicated and memorial names
I-485 in North Carolina is split into four dedicated or memorialized stretches of freeway:

 Craig Lawing Freeway: The official name of the northwest section, named for W. Craig Lawing from milemarkers 10 to 23 that was approved on February 2, 2001.
 Governor James G. Martin Freeway: The official name of the southeast section, from milemarkers 31 to 67. It was named in honor of Governor James G. Martin who served North Carolina from 1985 to 1993 and was approved on December 4, 1993.
 H. Allen Tate, Jr. Highway: The official name of the northeast section, from milemarkers 23 to 31. It was named after the founder of Allen Tate Realtors and was dedicated on March 27, 2015.
 Seddon "Rusty" Goode Freeway: The official name of the southwest section, from milemarkers 0 to 10. Seddon Goode served on the transportation board in Mecklenburg County and helped bring I-485 as a reality. It was approved on March 7, 1997.
 Doctor Jay M. Robinson Freeway: It was the official name of the northeast section, from 2001–2015 and named after a former superintendent of the Charlotte-Mecklenburg Schools system. Approved on January 5, 2001, it was never signed; when this section was finally constructed in 2015, it was redesignated to honor H. Allen Tate, Jr.

History

The first section of what became I-485 was completed around 1967, connecting a newly opened section of I-85 with US 29 near the Cabarrus–Mecklenburg county line. This section became a part of I-485 on May 5, 1999, the first section of the highway on the north end of the county.

In 1975, planning began for the Charlotte outerbelt.

On July 8, 1988, Governor James G. Martin and state transportation secretary Seddon Goode attended a groundbreaking near US 521, marking the start of construction on the first  section between US 521 and North Carolina Highway 51 (NC 51). Martin also announced the designation "Interstate 485" for what had previously been called the outerbelt. The section opened November 1, 1990, two months earlier than planned. Still, because of all the development in the area, the highway immediately became inadequate for the area's needs and required widening.

A $67.2-million (equivalent to $ in )  section of I-485 from US 521 to I-77 opened October 24, 1994. The section included a four-level interchange, the first and only in North Carolina, at its junction with I-77. On December 9, 1994, the section from NC 51 to Rea Road opened.

On July 1, 1997, a $13.9-million (equivalent to $ in )  section of I-485 opened between I-77 and NC 49, a section designated the Seddon "Rusty" Goode Jr. Freeway, named for a member of the North Carolina Board of Transportation who helped decide where I-485 would be built.

On August 15, 1997,  of I-485 opened between Rea Road and NC 16 (Providence Road). An $8.6-million (equivalent to $ in )  section from NC 49 to Brown-Grier Road in the Steele Creek community opened in two stages August 26 and 27; the name of Brown-Grier Road changed to Arrowood Road when that road was extended.  opened September 15, connecting NC 16 to US 74.

In May 1999, the original segment between I-85 and US 29 (North Tryon Street) was widened and upgraded to Interstate standards, officially becoming part of I-485; a few months later, on August 13, the segment was extended to NC 49 (University City Boulevard). In December 1999, the main section of I-485 continued its extension north from US 74 to Idlewild Road, adding . In June 2000, another  extension was completed, between Idlewild Road and Lawyers Road in Mint Hill, at a cost of $10.2 million (equivalent to $ in ).

In 2003, the last  needed to link main I-485 to its northern stub was completed, at a cost of $55.4 million (equivalent to $ in ). Opening in two phases, the first  segment opened on September 3, 2003, between University City Boulevard and NC 27 (Albemarle Road); two months later, the second  segment opened on November 19, between Albemarle Road and Lawyers Road. By end of 2003, I-485 was one continuous  freeway between I-85 (near Concord) to Arrowood Road.

On October 19, 2004, I-485 was widened, from four to six lanes between I-77/US 21 and Arrowood Road, and extended between Arrowood Road and I-85 (near Belmont). Completion of the $100-million (equivalent to $ in )  segment was noted that it would relieve traffic along the Billy Graham Parkway and provide an alternative route to Charlotte Douglas International Airport. On December 15, 2006, a  segment between I-85 (near Belmont) and NC 27 (Mount Holly Road) opened; signed as Future I-485, it was also dedicated as the Craig Lawing Freeway. Six months later, on May 9, 2007, another  segment, between Mount Holly Road and NC 16 (Brookshire Boulevard) was opened. On December 4, 2008, a  segment between Brookshire Boulevard and NC 115 (Old Statesville Road) was opened; all future signage was removed from the previous segments, with new signage showing connection between I-77, toward Statesville, and I-85, toward Spartanburg. In 2011, West Boulevard interchange (exit 6) was opened to traffic, existing previously as a graded future interchange since 2004.

The final segment, from I-77 to I-85 near the UNC Charlotte, had begun the right-of-way acquisition phase with contracts awarded in June 2010. The segment opened to traffic on June 5, 2015, finally completing the loop and providing a direct connection from I-77 near Huntersville to I-85 near Concord Mills.

Since 2003, the North Carolina Department of Transportation (NCDOT) made sure that future segments of I-485 were designed with a minimum of six travel lanes. While the first segments of I-485 were already choked by traffic, thanks to Charlotte's rapid growth, NCDOT could not immediately deal with the issue thanks to a 2000 policy that prevented the state using trust fund money, a major source of funding for new projects, to widen existing roads. Eventually, NCDOT was able to allocate new funds for a widening project, between US 521 (Johnston Road) and I-77/US 21, which was slated for construction in 2012. On November 18, 2011, NCDOT changed the plans with an extension of the widening project to Rea Road and additional space allocated for a future toll lane, between Johnston Road and I-77/US 21. Construction on the modified widening project began in 2013; at a cost of $83.3 million (equivalent to $ in ), the  widening project was completed in December 2015.

On January 15, 2017, the Oakdale Road interchange (exit 18) was opened to traffic, existing previously as a graded future interchange since 2008.

Future

Since November 18, 2011, NCDOT has made plans for future toll lanes along I-485. Modifying an already planned widening project between US 521 (Johnston Road) and I-77/US 21, it called on a future toll lane to be constructed as well as extending the widening project towards Rea Road. The future toll lanes, when completed would be between US 74 (Independence Boulevard) and I-77/US 21; in April 2014, the Charlotte Regional Transportation Planning Organization (CRTPO) adopted the 2040 Metropolitan Transportation Plan (MTP), which included establishing toll lanes along I-485. The first segment of the new toll lanes, between Johnston Road and I-77/US 21, were completed in December 2015 but were not opened. The new unopen lanes along I-485 became controversial and discussions were made about making it a high-occupancy vehicle lane (HOV lane), or at least temporally; however, local and state officials said that could not be done and would cost more for just temporary use of the lanes.

At a cost of $202.9 million, the  I-485 Express Lanes project will establish new toll lanes along its entire planned route. It will also include the following improvements: adding additional general purpose lanes between Providence Road and Rea Road, extending auxiliary lanes between Independence Boulevard and East John Street, establishing dedicated connectors from the Express Lanes to Johnston Road (eastbound only) and Westinghouse Boulevard (westbound only), and incorporating the existing planned project of adding a new interchange at Weddington Road. Tolls would be collected using an electronic toll collection (ETC) system; drivers will need to have the NC Quick Pass, or other interoperable transponder, or will be billed by mail with a higher rate. Construction was slated to begin "tentatively" in mid-2018.

Exit list
Milemarker numbering along the loop freeway goes in a clockwise direction, beginning and ending at the interchange with I-77/US 21 in southern Charlotte.

See also

Carowinds
I-485 / South Boulevard (LYNX station)

References

External links

 
 NCRoads.com: I-485

Transportation in Charlotte, North Carolina
85-4
85-4
485
4
Transportation in Mecklenburg County, North Carolina